Miguel Mateo Maldonado y Cabrera (1695–1768) was a Mestizo painter born in Oaxaca but moved to Mexico City, the capital of Viceroyalty of New Spain. During his lifetime, he was recognized as the greatest painter in all of New Spain.  He created religious and secular art for the Catholic Church and wealthy patrons.  His casta paintings, depicting interracial marriage among Amerindians, Spaniards and Africans, are considered among the genre's finest. Cabrera's paintings range from tiny works on copper to enormous canvases and wall paintings. He also designed altarpieces and funerary monuments.

Biography 

Cabrera was born in Antequera, today's Oaxaca, Oaxaca, and moved to Mexico City in 1719. He may have studied under the Rodríguez Juárez brothers or José de Ibarra.  Cabrera was a favorite painter of Archbishop Manuel José Rubio y Salinas, whose portrait he twice painted, and of the Jesuits, which earned him many commissions. 

In 1 he created an important analytical study of the icon of the Virgin of Guadalupe, Maravilla americana y conjunto de raras maravillas observadas con la dirección de las reglas del arte de la pintura (1756) ("American marvel and ensemble of rare wonders observed with the direction of the rules of the art of painting", often referred to in English simply as American Marvel). Cabrera and a group of six other painters analyzed the painting, with scientific eyes, not religious, identifying four different substances used in the painting: "oil, tempera with agglutinates, an aguazo, and a fresco-like tempera." In Cabrera's assessment, no painter was capable of using such techniques in the eighteenth century, much less in the sixteenth century, when the image was created. Cabrera was concerned that there was a proliferation of inferior copies of the painting, and let it be known that the noted seventeenth-century painter, Juan Correa, used a waxed paper template of the image, so that down to the last detail, copies were faithful to the original.  Cabrera's atelier created many copies of the image, some of which were signed by Cabrera himself. He sought faithfulness to the original image but to add luster and power to the copies, some paintings had the notation "touched to the original," [Tocada a su Original] with the date.  In 1752 he was again permitted access to the icon of Our Lady of Guadalupe to make three copies with the aid of fellow painters, José de Alcíbar and José Bentura Arnáez. The copies were for his patron Archbishop José Manuel Rubio y Salinas, one for Pope Benedict XIV, and a third to use "as a model for further copies." 

The essential purpose of Maravilla Americana was to affirm the 1666 opinions of the witnesses who swore that the image of the Virgin was of a miraculous nature. However, he also elaborated a novel opinion: the image was crafted with a unique variety of techniques. He contended that the Virgin's face and hands were painted in oil paint, while her tunic, mandorla, and the cherub at her feet were all painted in egg tempera. Finally, her mantle was executed in gouache. He observed that the golden rays emanating from the Virgin seemed to be of dust that was woven into the very fabric of the canvas, which he asserted was of "a coarse weave of certain threads which we vulgarly call pita," a cloth woven from palm fibers.

His involvement in the analysis of the Guadalupe image was part of his long term campaign to raise the status of painters from mere artisans to respected practitioners of the liberal arts. It came at the same time that Mexican archbishop Manuel José Rubio y Salinas (1749-1765) sought the designation of the Virgin of Guadalupe as a universal patron.  Jesuit Francisco López was the advocate in Rome for her cause. Benedict XIV recognized Guadalupe with her own feast day, starting in 1754. 

In 1753, he founded the second Academy of Painting in Mexico City and served as its director.

Most of the rest of his works are also religious in nature; as the official painter of the Archbishop of Mexico, Cabrera painted his and other portraits.  In 1760, Cabrera created The Virgin of the Apocalypse, which describes the chapter 12 of the Book of Revelation.  He is also known for his posthumous portrait of the seventeenth-century poet Sor Juana Inés de la Cruz. 

Cabrera is currently most famous for his casta paintings. One of the sixteen in the set that was missing for many years was purchased by the Los Angeles County Museum of Art in 2015. The museum received information that the last of the sixteen, thought lost, may be in Los Angeles, California.

In the 19th century, the writer José Bernardo Couto called him "the personification of the great artist and of the painter par excellence; and a century after his death the supremacy which he knew how to merit remains intact." His remains are interred at the Church of Santa Inés in Mexico City.

Gallery

See also
Casta painting
Mexican art

References

Further reading
Bailey, Gauvin Alexander. Art of Colonial Latin America. London: Phaidon Press 2005. 
 Carrillo y Gariel, Abelardo. El pintor Miguel Cabrera.  México, Instituto Nacional de Antropología e Historia, 1966. 
 Castro Mantecón, Javier; Manuel Zárate AquinoMiguel Cabrera, pintor oaxaqueño del siglo XVIII,. México, Instituto Nacional de Antropología 41579}}exas Press 1967.
 Katzew, Ilona. Casta Painting. New Haven: Yale University Press 2004.
 Peterson, Jeanette Favrot. Visualizing Guadalupe. Austin: University of Texas Press 2014.
 Toussaint, Manuel. Colonial Art in Mexico. Translated and edited by Elizabeth Wilder Weisman. Austin: University of Texas Press 1967.

External links
 Historia del Convento de Sta. Ines y creación del Museo JLC,; Beatriz del Carmen Cuevas
 Maravilla Americana at Internet Archive

Colonial Mexico
Zapotec people
Mestizo painters
18th-century Mexican painters
18th-century male artists
Mexican male painters
Mexican male writers
Artists from Oaxaca
Writers from Oaxaca
1695 births
1768 deaths
Latin American artists of indigenous descent
18th-century indigenous painters of the Americas
18th-century Indigenous Mexican painters
People of New Spain
Religious painters